Kristey Williams (born October 16, 1970) is an American politician who has served in the Kansas House of Representatives from the 77th district since 2015.

References

1970 births
Living people
Republican Party members of the Kansas House of Representatives
21st-century American politicians
21st-century American women politicians
Women state legislators in Kansas
People from Augusta, Kansas
University of Kansas alumni